List of Imperial German Uhlan Regiments

German Uhlan Regiments

Notes

External links
 A Pocket German Army

Sources

 
 

German Army (German Empire)
Military history of Germany
Cavalry regiments of Germany
Imp